Jewell Caples (June 12, 1968 – May 6, 2022), better known as Jewell, was an American contemporary R&B singer best known for her work with Death Row Records in the early 1990s. She was called the "First Lady of Death Row Records".

Career
From 1992 to 1997, Jewell provided vocals on albums from various Death Row artists such as Dr. Dre, Snoop Dogg, and 2Pac, in addition to motion picture soundtracks produced by the label. Her biggest solo success was her 1994 cover of Shirley Brown's song "Woman to Woman", which peaked at #72 on the Billboard Hot 100 and #16 on the Hot R&B/Hip-Hop Songs chart.

Jewell was among many artists who departed Death Row between 1998 and 1999 due to financial and legal issues involving CEO Suge Knight, and her singing career wound down in the 2000s. In October 2011, she published the memoir My Blood My Sweat My Tears, in which she claimed that her past association with Knight prevented her from gaining another recording deal. An accompanying soundtrack to the book was released.

Health issues and death
Caples was hospitalized in 2019 after she stopped breathing and collapsed while shopping at a Walmart, with the cause not made public. In an October 2021 interview, she said that she was given six months to live, and hurried to release her final album, Love + Pain = Musik, as a result. Caples was hospitalized twice in March 2022 due to a self-described "lung injury illness", during which she had eight pounds of fluid removed from her heart, legs and lungs. She died at age 53 on May 6, 2022.

Discography

Studio albums

Compilation albums

Singles

As lead artist

As featured artist

References

External links
 
 

1968 births
2022 deaths
Singers from Chicago
Death Row Records artists
American hip hop singers
20th-century African-American women singers
21st-century African-American women singers